Pilosella aurantiaca (fox-and-cubs, orange hawk bit, devil's paintbrush, grim-the-collier) is a perennial flowering plant in the family Asteraceae that is native to alpine regions of central and southern Europe, where it is protected in several regions.

Description
All parts of the plant exude a milky juice. The flowering stem is usually leafless or with just one or two small leaves. The stem and leaves are covered with short stiff hairs (trichomes), usually blackish in color. The flowers are orange, almost red, which is virtually invisible to bees, yet they also reflect ultraviolet light, increasing their conspicuousness to pollinators. The flowers are visited by various insects, including many species of bees, butterflies, pollinating flies. The flowers themselves come in a range of colors from a deep rust-orange to a pure yellow and often show striking gradients of color. In the UK, it flowers in June and July.
After flowering, it produces seedpods with a pappus of white or pale brown hairs.

The plant propagates through its wind-dispersed seeds, and also vegetatively by dividing the stolons and shallow rhizomes. in autumn or spring.

Taxonomy
The Latin specific epithet aurantiaca means ”orange”, referring to the usual colour of the blooms.
The common name of fox-and-cubs is due to the appearance of the open flowers (the fox) beside the flower buds (the cubs).

Cultivation and uses

P. aurantiaca is widely grown as an ornamental plant in gardens for its very decorative flowers. It is often used in wildflower gardens because its bright orange flowers are highly attractive to a wide array of pollinators.

Invasive weed
Orange hawkweed is currently the only hawkweed considered regionally invasive in areas of British Columbia, Canada. It is considered invasive in the East Kootenay, Central Kootenay, Columbia-Shuswap, Thompson-Nicola, Bulkley Nechako, and Cariboo Regional Districts. Invasive hawkweed can replace native vegetation in open, undisturbed natural areas such as meadows, reducing forage and threatening biodiversity. In Victoria and NSW, Australia, hawkweed species are declared as "State Prohibited Weeds" and are controlled under The Bio Security Act 2015. Orange hawkweed is also considered an invasive species in some states in the United States of America, such as Wisconsin and Minnesota. Currently there are several eradication programs operating (often employing volunteers) to locate, prevent the spread of and eradicate any Pilosella or Hieracium plants.

References

aurantiaca
Alpine flora
Plants described in 1753
Taxa named by Carl Linnaeus